Leave It to the Marines is a 1951 American black-and-white comedy film from Lippert Pictures.  It was produced by Sigmund Neufeld, directed by Sam Newfield and starred Lippert contract star Sid Melton.

Plot
Gerald Meek goes to apply for a marriage license but enlists in the United States Marine Corps by mistake.

Cast
Sid Melton 	...  Gerald Sylvester Meek
Mara Lynn  	... Myrna McAllister
Gregg Martell  ... 	Sgt. 'Foghorn' McTaggert
Ida Moore  	... 	Grandma Meek
Sam Flint  	... 	Col. Flenge
Douglas Evans  	... Gen. Garvin 
Margia Dean  	... 	Cpl. Trudy 'Tootie' Frisbee
Richard Monahan  	... Pvt. Partridge

External links 
 

1951 films
American black-and-white films
Military humor in film
Films about the United States Marine Corps
Lippert Pictures films
1951 comedy films
American comedy films
Films directed by Sam Newfield
1950s English-language films
1950s American films